This List of La Salle University people includes alumni, faculty,

Alumni 
 Note: Individuals may be listed in more than one category.

Government, law, and public policy 

 Francis L. Bodine – former member of New Jersey General Assembly
 Kevin J. Boyle – member of Pennsylvania House of Representatives since 2011
 William J. Burns – United States Ambassador to Jordan; Deputy Secretary of State 2011–2014; head of Carnegie Endowment for International Peace
 John F. Byrne Sr. - Pennsylvania State Senator for the 8th district from 1951 to 1952, Philadelphia City Councilman
 Billy Ciancaglini - Republican nominee for mayor of Philadelphia, 2019
 Tina Davis – member of Pennsylvania House of Representatives 
 Madeleine Dean – U.S. Congresswoman
 Joseph DeFelice – former chair of Philadelphia GOP and current Trump appointee
Joseph T. Doyle – Pennsylvania State Representative for the 163rd district 1971–78
 Michael Driscoll – businessman, member of Pennsylvania House of Representatives since 2015, founder of the iconic Philadelphia Irish pub, Finnigan's Wake
 Dwight Evans, U.S. Congressman from Pennsylvania's 2nd congressional district
 Edward Fenlon – former member of Michigan House of Representatives and jurist
 Brian Fitzpatrick – U.S. Congressman from Pennsylvania's 8th congressional district
 Tom Gola – NBA Naismith Hall of Fame basketball player; Philadelphia City Controller 1970–71
 William F. Harrity – National Chairman of Democratic Party (1892–1896)
 Tom Houghton – former Pennsylvania State Representative
 William F. Keller – member of Pennsylvania House of Representatives
 Jim Kenney – Mayor of Philadelphia since 2016
 Emmett Joseph Leahy (1910–1964), American archivist and entrepreneur, pioneer in the discipline of records management
 Joanna E. McClinton – Pennsylvania State Representative since 2015
 Tom Murt – Pennsylvania State Representative from the 152nd district
 Dennis M. O'Brien – Speaker of Pennsylvania House of Representatives; Philadelphia City Councilman
 Michael H. O'Brien – Pennsylvania House of Representatives
 Michael J. Stack III – Lieutenant Governor of Pennsylvania alongside Tom Wolf
 Mark Squilla – member of Philadelphia City Council
 Sarah Wescott-Williams – first Prime Minister of Country Saint Maarten (2010–2014)
 Chris Wogan – former Pennsylvania representative and judge
 John Waldron – American criminal defense lawyer

Business 
 Tom Curley – co-creator, former President of USA Today
 Larry Miller – President of the Jordan Brand

Academia & Education
 Stephen Andriole – Thomas G. Labrecque Chair of Business Technology at Villanova University
 John D. Caputo – Thomas J. Watson Professor of Humanities at Syracuse University; founder of weak theology
 Naomi Halas – Stanley C. Moore Professor in Electrical and Computer Engineering and Professor in Chemistry at Rice University
 Paula Krebs – Executive Director of the Modern Language Association (MLA), 2017–present
 Michael McGinniss – President of Christian Brothers University, 1994–1999, and La Salle University, 1999–2014

Literature
 Michael F. Flynn – science fiction author
 Charles Fuller – playwright, winner of the Pulitzer Prize
 Jack McDevitt – science fiction author
 Matthew Quick – author

Fine arts
 John McShain – builder of The Pentagon, Jefferson Memorial, and Kennedy Center

Entertainment 

 Peter Boyle – Emmy award winning actor
 Ralph Garman – actor, voice actor
 Jessica Barth – actress

Journalism and media 
 Adam Bagni – sportscaster
 Tom Curley –  founder of USA Today, former CEO of AP
 A.J. Daulerio – editor-in-chief of Gawker, Deadspin, The Small Bow
 Brady Hicks – wrestling journalist
 Tim Legler – NBA, ESPN analyst
 Meredith Marakovits – YES Network reporter
 Jillian Mele – former host at Fox News, current host at WPVI-TV
 Bill Raftery – ESPN and CBS Sports college basketball analyst
 Gary Smith – sportswriter

Miscellaneous

Michael William Brescia – convicted bank robber, part of the Midwest Bank Robbers group
Johnny Dougherty – labor leader
Walter P. Lomax Jr. – medical practitioner

Athletics

American football 
 Mike Mandarino – NFL
 George Somers – NFL

Soccer 
 Cesidio Colasante – MLS draft pick
 John McCarthy – goalkeeper for the Philadelphia Union
 Courtney Niemiec – defender for the Portland Thorns FC
 Ryan Richter – defender for Ottawa Fury FC

Basketball 
 Michael Brooks – NBA and Europe; professional career lasted 1980–2008
 Joe Bryant – NBA and Europe, father of Kobe Bryant, former head coach of Los Angeles Sparks of WNBA
 Rasual Butler –  Last played for the San Antonio Spurs died on January 31, 2018
 Larry Cannon – ABA player
 Fran Dunphy – head coach for Temple Owls men's basketball
 Larry Foust – 8-time NBA All-Star (1951–1956, 1958–1959)
 Ramon Galloway – professional basketball player
 Tom Gola – enshrined in Naismith Memorial Basketball Hall of Fame in 1976; NBA champion (1956); 5-time NBA All-Star (1960–1964); No. 15 retired by La Salle 

 B.J. Johnson - current NBA player
 Tim Legler – NBA, analyst for ESPN's NBA coverage
 Tom Piotrowski - (basketball) NBA, FIBA, CBA
 Ralph Lewis – NBA player
 Joe Mihalich – head coach of Hofstra University men's basketball
 Larry Miller – former President of NBA's Portland Trail Blazers; president of Jordan Brand
 Jeff Neubauer – head coach of Eastern Kentucky University men's basketball
 Doug Overton – NBA, played in 11 NBA seasons for eight different teams; head coach for Springfield Armor
 Jim Phelan – basketball player and coach
 Bill Raftery – ESPN and CBS Sports college basketball analyst
 Cheryl Reeve – head coach of WNBA's Minnesota Lynx; by percentage the winningest coach in league's history, most postseason games of any WNBA coach
 Lionel Simmons – NBA, third-leading scorer in NCAA history; drafted 7th overall by Sacramento Kings in 1990
 Steven Smith – NBA, Serie A player
 Christian Standhardinger – BBL player
 Fatty Taylor – ABA, NBA player
 Randy Woods – NBA player
Stephen Zack (born 1992), basketball player for Hapoel Holon in the Israeli Basketball Premier League

Olympians
La Salle Olympians have won a total of six medals (four gold, and two bronze) in 11 Olympic Games.

Diane Bracalente – field hockey, Seoul 1988
Michael Brooks, captain of the boycotted 1980 basketball team
Al Cantello – track and field, Rome 1960
Stan Cwiklinski –  rowing, gold medal, men's eight, Tokyo 1964
 Ira Davis – track and field, Rome 1960; placed 4th in the triple jump
Hugh Foley – rowing, gold medal, men's eight, Tokyo 1964
Charles Kieffer – rowing, gold medal, men's pair with coxswain, Los Angeles 1932
Kathy McGahey – field hockey, bronze medal,  Los Angeles 1984
Diane Moyer – field hockey, Moscow 1980; bronze medal, Los Angeles 1984
 John Uelses – first person to pole vault 16' (4.88 m), setting the world record (failed to qualify at trials)
Joe Verdeur – swimming, gold medal, in 200 meter breaststroke, London 1948

Faculty

Former faculty
Austin App – considered America's first major Holocaust denier
Joseph DeFelice - former chair of the Philadelphia GOP
Mary Ellen Balchunis – professor in the Political Science department until 2015 and Democratic nominee for Congress in 2014, 2016
Madeleine Dean - English writing and ethics professor for 10 years in La Salle's Arts and Sciences department
John Lukacs – historian specializing in populism
Paul Westhead - English professor at La Salle from 1972-1979 and NBA head coach for the 1980 championship-winning Los Angeles Lakers

Selected men's basketball head coaches

University Presidents

References

La Salle University people